Phyllonorycter agilella is a moth of the family Gracillariidae. It is found in Latvia central Russia, Pyrenees, Italy and Bulgaria and from France to eastern Russia.

Its larvae feed on Ulmus glabra, Ulmus laevis and Ulmus minor, mining the leaves of their host plant. They create a lower-surface (but sometimes upper-surface), weakly folded tentiform mine. The folded side of the mine is whitish. The pupa is created in a very loose cocoon.

References

External links
 bladmineerders.nl
 Fauna Europaea
 

agilella
Leaf miners
Moths described in 1846
Moths of Asia
Moths of Europe
Taxa named by Philipp Christoph Zeller